Isaiah Demetryst Frey (born April 6, 1990) is a former American football free safety. He was drafted by the Chicago Bears in the sixth round of the 2012 NFL Draft. He played college football for Nevada.

He has played for the Tampa Bay Buccaneers and Dallas Cowboys.

Early life
Frey was born on April 6, 1990 in Roseville, California. Frey's father, Demetryst Cornish, is a Walter Payton fan, and therefore named Frey's dogs "Bear" and "Payton." Frey and linebacker Lance Briggs were also from the same area.

College career
Frey played in college as a cornerback for the Nevada Wolf Pack. During his time at Nevada, he recorded 141 tackles, seven interceptions, seven tackles-for-loss, one sack and two forced fumbles in 51 games. During his year as a senior, Frey was named first-team all-WAC after tying for first in the FBS with 21 pass breakups and recording a career-high five interceptions.

Professional career

Chicago Bears
Though Frey was projected to be an undrafted free agent, he was picked in the 6th round, 184th overall by the Chicago Bears in the 2012 NFL Draft.

On May 9, 2012, the Bears signed Frey to a four-year deal.

In the third game of the preseason against the New York Giants, Frey intercepted a David Carr pass in the end zone with 1:06 in the game to give the Bears a 20-17 victory. However, he was waived on August 31. He later was placed on the Bears' practice squad.

The Bears waived Frey on August 26, 2014. On September 1, 2014, he was re-signed to the practice squad.

He was again released by the Bears on October 7, 2014 and replaced on the team's roster by practice squad member Al Louis-Jean.

Tampa Bay Buccaneers
Frey signed with the Tampa Bay Buccaneers on October 14, 2014. He was released on September 5, 2015.

Pittsburgh Steelers
On October 27, 2015, Frey was signed to the Pittsburgh Steelers' practice squad.

Dallas Cowboys
On June 13, 2016, Frey was signed by the Dallas Cowboys. On September 3, 2016, he was released by the Cowboys.

References

External links
Chicago Bears bio

1990 births
American football cornerbacks
Chicago Bears players
Dallas Cowboys players
Living people
Nevada Wolf Pack football players
Players of American football from California
Sportspeople from Roseville, California
Tampa Bay Buccaneers players